Discovery Passage is a strait that forms part of the Inside Passage between Vancouver Island and the Discovery Islands of British Columbia. The strait is considered the most important natural passage for vessels' entering or leaving the Salish Sea from the north.

Etymology
The strait was named by Captain Vancouver in 1792 after his ship, . Other sources say that the passage was named by Captain Kellett because Vancouver's Discovery had sailed through the passage earlier.

Geography
Most of the eastern shoreline of the passage is Quadra Island, with Sonora Island forming the shoreline at the northern end where Discovery Passage meets Johnstone Strait. The southern end of Discovery Passage enters the Strait of Georgia, the northern arm of the Salish Sea.

The strait is frequently transited by cruise ships, cargo ships, fishing boats, and ships of the Alaska Marine Highway and BC Ferries systems.

See also
 Cordero Channel
 Sutil Channel
 Campbell River, British Columbia

References

External links

Straits of British Columbia
South Coast of British Columbia
Landforms of the Discovery Islands
Salish Sea